"Every You Every Me" is a song by British alternative rock band Placebo, released as the third single from their second album, Without You I'm Nothing, on 25 January 1999. It was released as a 2-CD set and on cassette, but promotional copies on 12-inch vinyl exist. The single managed to chart at number 46 in Australia, number 99 in Germany, and number 11 on the UK Singles Chart. There are two versions of the video, both filmed live at London's Brixton Academy; one includes clips from the film Cruel Intentions. An alternative video taking place at a casino was filmed in November 1998 but would not be released until 18 years later as part of the promotion for A Place for Us to Dream. 

It was voted from a poll of 500,000 votes to be ranked number 83 on the list of the Hottest 100 of All Time in July 2009, conducted by Australian radio station Triple J. Croatian metal band Ashes You Leave covered "Every You Every Me" on their 2009 album Songs of the Lost. and in 2017, Lisa Mitchell covered the song on her EP When They Play That Song. The song was featured on the Cruel Intentions soundtrack.

Background
Along with the rest of the album (apart from "Pure Morning"), "Every You Every Me" was recorded in early 1998 at Real World Studios with Steve Osborne. When asked who it was about, Brian Molko replied with "Who's it about? I'm not really too sure just yet. I think it's about a lot of people. Probably anybody... everybody who's had the displeasure of sleeping with me." About his choice to include it in the Cruel Intentions soundtrack, Molko said that he "studied drama, I know the original (Dangerous Liaisons) and we watched it on the tour bus when they wanted to use our song. I said: 'If he doesn't die in the end, if it's a happy ending, we don't do it.' It's quite perverted and manipulative, so the theme of the song fits in quite well."

Track listings
UK CD1 and cassette single, European CD single
 "Every You Every Me" (single mix)
 "Nancy Boy" (Blue Amazon mix)
 "Every You Every Me" (Infected by the Scourge of the Earth mix)

UK CD2
 "Every You Every Me" (album version)
 "Every You Every Me" (Sneaker Pimps version)
 "Every You Every Me" (Brothers in Rhythm Glam Club mix)

Australian CD single
 "Every You Every Me" (single mix)
 "Every You Every Me" (Sneaker Pimps version)
 "Every You Every Me" (Infected by the Scourge of the Earth mix)
 "Pure Morning" (Les Rythmes Digitales remix)

Charts

Certifications

Release history

References

Placebo (band) songs
1999 singles
1998 songs
Hut Records singles
Songs written by Brian Molko
Songs written by Stefan Olsdal
Songs written by Steve Hewitt